The 1990 Nevada Wolf Pack football team was an American football team that represented the University of Nevada, Reno in the Big Sky Conference (BSC) during the 1990 NCAA Division I-AA football season. In their 15th season under head coach Chris Ault, the Wolf Pack compiled a 13–2 record (7–1 against conference opponents), won the BSC championship, and lost to Georgia Southern in the NCAA Division I-AA Football Championship Game. They played their home games at Mackay Stadium.

Schedule

References

Nevada
Nevada Wolf Pack football seasons
Big Sky Conference football champion seasons
Nevada Wolf Pack football